Al-Zabadani or Az-Zabadani is a city and popular hill station in southwestern Syria in the Rif Dimashq Governorate, close to the border with Lebanon. It is located in the center of a green valley surrounded by high mountains at an elevation of around 1,100 m.

Its history is linked to the oldest capital in history, Damascus. It is located to the right of the international road linking Damascus to Beirut, in the middle of the distance between Damascus and Baalbek, in a mountain valley in the Syrian mountain range, where it rises between 1,150 and 1,250 meters above sea level. Zabadani is located in the semi-arid to semi-humid region, with an average rainfall of 500 mm per year. It is bordered by two mountain ranges, Mount Senir to the west and Jabal Al Shaqif to the east, and in the middle of it is a green carpet that forms the Zabadani Plain.

According to the Syria Central Bureau of Statistics (CBS), in the 2004 census Al-Zabadani had a population of 26,285.

Overview
Compared to Damascus, the weather in Al-Zabadani tends to be milder in summer, about 5–8 degrees lower, but from December to the end of February it is colder with a lot of snow, and the temperature drops to −10 degrees. 

The mild summer weather, along with scenic views, led the French colonial rulers to develop the city as a traditional summer resort and hill station, and has made the town a popular resort, both for tourists and for visitors from Syrian cities on the plains, especially nearby Damascus, and for tens of thousands of visitors from the Arabian peninsula. A more elevated region than Al-Zabadani is its neighbour Bloudan, also a resort for thousands of tourists. Bloudan is about 1,500 metres above sea level.

Al-Zabadani is predominantly Sunni, with a substantial Christian population, who have their own church and monastery. Before the Syrian Civil War, Al-Zabadani was rapidly growing and was well connected to Damascus. The War led to substantial destruction and damage of infrastructure and property, with rebuilding in progress.

History

In 1838, the population was noted as being Muslim and Greek Orthodox.

Climate
Al-Zabadani has a hot-summer Mediterranean climate (Köppen climate classification: Csa). In winter there is more rainfall than in summer. About  of precipitation falls annually.

Syrian Civil War

 

Al-Zabadani is vitally important to the Syrian government being located along the Lebanon border. It is also strategically important to Iran because, since at least as late as June 2011, it served as the Islamic Revolutionary Guard Corps's logistical hub for supplying Hezbollah.

On 18 January 2012, Zabadani became the first city to fall to the Free Syrian Army (FSA), following a bloody battle that lasted 11 days. The Syrian Army regained control of the city by 11 February.

By late July 2012, Zabadani had become a base of operations for Hezbollah and the Iranian Guards. In August, local fighters retook 70% of Zabadani with only a few isolated army checkpoints remaining. On 28 February 2014, a truce was reached between government and the rebels. Later it was reported that the truce broke down and that rebels attacked government checkpoints, with the government besieging and shelling the town. On 26 April 2014, the rebels surrendered after intense fighting with government troops, losing their last stronghold along Lebanon's border, only to regain control of the city months later. Following an extended siege by the Syrian Army and Hezbollah, a U.N.-brokered agreement was finally signed in September 2015, under which the city was successively evacuated by the rebels and control ceded back to the Syrian government on 19 April 2017.

City twinning
 Neunkirchen, Saarland, Germany

See also

Battle of Zabadani (2015)

References

Bibliography

External links
 More information from MiddleEast Information Network
 بوابة المجتمع المحلي في الزبداني 

Cities in Syria
Populated places in Al-Zabadani District
Scouting and Guiding in Syria
Eastern Orthodox Christian communities in Syria